George Treweek (31 March 1905 –  28 October 1991) was an Australian rugby league footballer who played in the 1920s and 1930s. He was a towering  in his time, who formed an integral part of the champion South Sydney teams of the 1920s and early 1930s. He is rated as one of the finest second-row forwards ever to play for Australia.

Club career
All up Treweek played 120 games for Souths between 1926 and 1934.

Representative career
He made 7 Test appearances for the Australian national representative side. His test debut was against the touring Great Britain team in 1928. He was selected to go on the 1929–30 Kangaroo tour of Great Britain, playing in four tests and 22 games in all and scoring six tries. Curren is listed on the Australian Players Register as kangaroo No. 142. Treweek also played eighteen games for NSW.

Accolades
In 2004 he was named by the Souths in their South Sydney Dream Team, consisting of 17 players and a coach representing the club from 1908 through to 2004. In 2006 he was inducted into the ARL Hall of Fame.

In February 2008, Treweek was named in the list of Australia's 100 Greatest Players (1908–2007) which was commissioned by the NRL and ARL to celebrate the code's centenary year in Australia.

In 2010, Treweek was named as captain in the Mascot Juniors RLFC Team of the Century.

Surname and spelling
George Treweeke was born Albert George Treweek. The family name was always spelled without the final e. His brothers and parents all kept the original spelling but George changed it to Treweeke.  He never had the heart to tell the press of the day that they had spelled his name wrong throughout his entire career.  The proper spelling of his surname is actually Treweek not Treweeke though he graciously accepted Treweeke throughout his life.

Footnotes

Sources
Andrews, Malcolm. The ABC of Rugby League. Australia: ABC Books, 2006.

1905 births
Australian rugby league players
South Sydney Rabbitohs players
Australia national rugby league team players
South Sydney Rabbitohs captains
New South Wales rugby league team players
1991 deaths
Rugby league second-rows